Reona (written: ,  or  in katakana) is a feminine Japanese given name. Notable people with the name include:

, Japanese musician and cosplayer
, Japanese swimmer
, Japanese physicist and laureate of 1973 Nobel Prize in Physics
, Japanese actress
, Japanese conductor

Japanese feminine given names